One Life is a studio album by South African artist Johnny Clegg, released in 2006. Johnny Clegg, Renaud and Claude Six are listed as the executive producers in the liner notes. The CD and liner notes - with numerous typos - were produced by Marabi Productions.

About the tracks
"Daughter of Eden" is, as the liner notes say, a song for the Goddess. Johnny Clegg has stated how he is interested in the various Goddess mythologies in various cultures, and also, men's reactions to women. He maintains that men are slightly awed or puzzled by women, for the following reasons. First, man is born of woman - which implies woman came first. Secondly, men are born twice from women - once physically, and once intellectually, in that man receive their knowledge from women, viz. the forbidden fruit in the Garden of Eden.

"Jongosi" is derived from an Afrikaans phrase, literally meaning 'Young ox', and used to designate a particularly feisty and lively person. This track is a tribute to young sportsmen and women who are able to perform at their highest level under pressure.

"Makhabeleni" is a tribute to all parents, and was born out of Johnny Clegg's impressions from his first visit to Zululand in 1970, to the eponymous village, with his friend Sipho Mchunu. Johnny was struck how Sipho referred to all men and women of his father's and mother's respective generations as 'Father' and 'Mother'. In a particular incident, one man called Sipho over and asked, 'How much money did you give your mother?'. Sipho gave his answer, to which the man replied, 'That's not enough! Give her more!' Johnny Clegg at first thought this was an unwarranted intrusion into his friend's affairs, but later came to understand that ALL parents and adults take an active and benevolent interest in the lives of the young people in the community.

"Thamela" (Warm yourself in the sun), or 'Die Son Trek Water' (The sun draws water) is Johnny Clegg's first track to incorporate Afrikaans lyrics. It deals with migrant workers separated from their lovers for long periods of time, and the quality of their love. If it's like the ocean, it cannot be diminished by evaporation by the sun - or distance, as the case may be.

"The Revolution Will Eat Its Children" is aimed squarely at Robert Mugabe. Johnny Clegg noted how much he - and the international community - respected Nelson Mandela's decision to step down at the end of his term as president. The suggestion in the song is that some other African rulers succumb to their lust for power, and that it would be better if they, too, step down gracefully.

Tracks 6 and 16, "Utshani Obulele" refer to a Zulu proverb meaning 'The dry dead grass is made young and green by fire', and how every dark or painful incident in our lives has a positive aspect. While the theme of both tracks is similar, the lyrics deal with two separate incidents - track 6 seems to concern an adolescent love affair, while track 16 deals with betrayal by a neighbour (someone from the same village).

"Touch the Sun" is a tribute to Johnny Clegg's sister, Diane, who died in 2004 at the age of 38 to cancer. The song is more positive and upbeat than the subject would suggest, and hints at Diane's acceptance and peace of mind near the end.

Track listing
 "Daughter of Eden"
 "Jongosi"
 "Makhabeleni"
 "Thamela-Die Son Trek Water"
 "The Revolution Will Eat Its Children (anthem for Uncle Bob)"
 "Utshani Obulele"
 "Faut Pas Baisser Les Bras"
 "Devana"
 "Bull Heart"
 "Day in the Life"
 "Boy Soldier"
 "Touch the Sun"
 "4 Box Square"
 "I Don't Want to Be Away"
 "Locked and Loaded"
 "Utshani Obulele (Zulu version)"
 "Asilazi"
All songs, music and lyrics by Johnny Clegg, except "Faut Pas Baisser les Bras", lyrics by Claude Six and Johnny Clegg, and vocal intro to "Thamela", traditional.

Johnny Clegg albums
2006 albums